Fielfraz was a Danish band, which had its heyday between 1990 and 1996. The band members were Claus Hempler on guitar and vocals, Nils Brakchi on bass, Kenneth Priisholm on guitar (lead) and Jens Langhorn on drums.

After several years of building up a live reputation in Odense, Fielfraz broke through with their very first record Shine, a Beatlesque guitar-oriented rock record. 1992's Electric Eel also included big radio hits like Surfer and Naked but the album as a whole was a lesser success. The third album, Slick, came late in 1996 and although widely critically acclaimed, it was largely ignored by the public.

Fielfraz continued to perform live occasionally, but Priisholm eventually left the band for good, leaving Fielfraz as a trio which released Hempler in 2004.

Fielfraz have been cited as an influence on Danish rock and grunge bands that broke through in the early 1990s like Kashmir and Dizzy Mizz Lizzy. However Fielfraz´ influences were primarily British; Priisholms guitar play was influenced by new wave like XTC and experimental rock like King Crimson and Claus Hemplers lyrics and vocal talent rendered Elvis Costello and Frank Sinatra, much more than hardcore punk and hard rock.

Fielfraz' time took place in a transitional period in the history of Danish rock, that broke the pop hegemony established by acts like Gnags, TV-2 and Sanne Salomonsen, in the 1980s. Alongside a few other British influenced 1990s acts like The Sandmen and Simcess, and the American influenced rock of D-A-D, they probably made the commercial breakthrough for the Danish grunge wave possibly in Denmark, by getting airplay on the dominating pop station, the national Danish radio (Danmarks Radio, P3).

Discography
 Shine - Genlyd/BMG, 1990 
 Electric Eel - Genlyd/BMG, 1992 
 Slick - Virgin, 1996

References

External links
 Brakchi

Danish rock music groups